Lorita lepidulana is a species of moth of the family Tortricidae. It is found in Puerto Rico, Cuba and on St. Thomas in the U.S. Virgin Islands.

References

Moths described in 1931
Cochylini